Srpski Itebej is a village in Serbia. It is situated in the Žitište municipality, Central Banat District, Vojvodina province. The village has a Serb ethnic majority (78.21%) and a Hungarian minority (10.60%), with a population of 2,405 (2002 census).

Historical population

1961: 4,634
1971: 4,058
1981: 3,281
1991: 2,873

Gallery

See also
List of places in Serbia
List of cities, towns and villages in Vojvodina

References
Slobodan Ćurčić, Broj stanovnika Vojvodine, Novi Sad, 1996.

External links 

Official web site of Srpski Itebej

Populated places in Serbian Banat